The National Evangelical Synod of Syria and Lebanon (NESSL), also known as  Synod SL (of Syria and Lebanon), is a Reformed denomination in the Middle East. It is a federation of Arabic-speaking congregations, that trace back their origin to the evangelical revival in the 19th century. These churches adopted Reformed theology and Presbyterian church government. This Reformed revival was supported by many Reformed churches in the United States. The Ottoman authorities recognised the Protestant faith in 1848, the first congregations were founded in Beirut, Hasbaya. Later congregations were established in the major cities. The Synod was organised in 1920 with several Presbyteries. There has been a steady growth in new members in recent years.

The church supports and runs over 20 schools and kindergartens. In 2004 it had 8,000 members and about 60 congregations.

The Evangelical Synod in the Middle East is a member of the World Communion of Reformed Churches, the World Council of Churches and the Middle East Council of Churches.

The president of the National Evangelical Synod of Syria and Lebanon is Reverend Doctor Salim Sahyouni and the vice-president is Reverend Samuel Hanna. Reverend Mgrditch Karageuzian is the Synod's Secretary General.

Affiliated churches 
List of the Churches

Syria 

 National Evangelical Presbyterian Church of Latakia
 The National Evangelical Church in Al Malkiyeh
 The National Evangelical Church in Al Quameshli
 The National Evangelical Church in Al Hasakeh
 The National Evangelical Church in Aleppo
 The National Evangelical Church in Edleb
 The National Evangelical Church in Al Ghassaniyeh
 The National Evangelical Church in Hamah
 The National Evangelical Church in Mhardeh
 The National Evangelical Church in Homs
 The National Evangelical Church in Feiruzi
 The National Evangelical Church in Al Hafar
 The National Evangelical Church in Amar Al Hoson
 The National Evangelical Church in Al Yazdiyeh
 The National Evangelical Church in Banias
 The National Evangelical Church in Al Gnaimiyeh
 The National Evangelical Church in Damascus
 The National Evangelical Church in Kharaba
 The National Evangelical Church in Ain Al Chaara
 The National Evangelical Church in Al Nabaq

Lebanon 

 The National Evangelical Church in Minyarah
 The National Evangelical Church in Tripoli
 The National Evangelical Church in Hakour
 The National Evangelical Church in Al Rabieh
 The National Evangelical Church in Ras Beirut
 The National Evangelical Church in Al Mrouj
 The National Evangelical Church in Souk Al Ghareb
 The National Evangelical Church in Ain Zhalta
 The National Evangelical Church in Zahleh
 The National Evangelical Church in Kab Elias
 The National Evangelical Church in Kherbet Kanafar
 The National Evangelical Church in Saghbin
 The National Evangelical Church in Al Jmailiye
 The National Evangelical Church in Majdalona
 The National Evangelical Church in Sidon
 The National Evangelical Church in Darb EL Sim
 The National Evangelical Church in Der Mimas
 The National Evangelical Church in Marjaaoun
 The National Evangelical Church in Ebel El Saki
 The National Evangelical Church in Aalma EL Chaab

References

External links
Official website
Facebook

Members of the World Communion of Reformed Churches
Reformed denominations in Asia
Protestantism in Lebanon
19th-century establishments in Asia
Protestantism in Syria